Jauharabad is a town and the district headquarters of Khushab District in the Punjab province of Pakistan. Jauharabad was established in 1953 as a planned city. Jauharabad is named after Maulana Muhammad Ali Jauhar, a prominent figure from the Pakistan independence movement. It is included in the Khushab district of Punjab, located in the Northern part of the country. Key locations near Jauharabad include the Salt range to the north and Khushab, the Jhelum River, and the Mianwali District to the west.

Etymology 
The urdu word 'jauhar' is translated to 'gem' in English, but the city was named after the popular Pakistan freedom activist Maulana Mohammad Ali Jauhar.

History
Jauharabad was developed in 1953 under a master plan. Because of its planned design including open spaces and wide avenues, the district headquarters of Khushab District was shifted from Khushab city to Jauharabad. It was planned to be the capital city of Pakistan before Islamabad. Jauharabad is one of the few planned urban settlements in Pakistan (others being Faisalabad, Sargodha, Islamabad, and Gwadar), developed from scratch under an urban master plan.
Construction of the 26th Safari Park of Pakistan is about to end.

The famous Islamic thinker, scholar and Jewish convert to Islam, Muhammad Asad (formerly Leopold Weiss) — author of The Road to Mecca, The Message of the Qur'an and Principles of State and Government in Islam, stayed at Jauharabad in the 1950s. He resided at the bungalow of the town's prominent resident, Chaudhry Niaz Ali Khan; who on the advice of Allama Muhammad Iqbal, had established the Dar ul Islam Trust Institutes first in Pathankot, India, after Pakistan's independence, in Jauharabad.

Geography
Jauharabad lies at the confluence of the Thal Desert and the Potohar in flat agricultural territory immediately south of the Salt Range, which marks the end of the Pothohar Plateau and the start of the Punjab plains. The Jhelum River passes 7 km southeast of Jauharabad and on the west of Jauharabad lies the Thal Desert. On the east of Jauharabad is the Khushab Reserve Forest, spread over approximately 4 km2.

Notable people

  Malik Shakir Bashir Awan, President Tanzeem ul Awan, Politician, Lawyer, Social Activist 
 Ahmad Nadeem Qasmi, journalist, writer
 Chaudhry Niaz Ali Khan, civil engineer, agriculturalist, and philanthropist who founded "Dar ul Islam Movement" and "Dar ul Islam Trust" 
 Malik Masood Nazir Rajar Chairman
 Sohail Warraich, prominent print and media Journalist.
 Sumaira Malik, former Pakistani government minister
 Wasif Ali Wasif, writer, poet and scholar

References

Populated places in Khushab District
Planned cities in Pakistan
Cities in Punjab (Pakistan)